The 5th International 500-Mile Sweepstakes Race was held at the Indianapolis Motor Speedway on Monday, May 31, 1915. The traditional race date of May 30 fell on a Sunday, but race organizers declined to schedule the race for Sunday. The race was set for Saturday May 29, but heavy rains in the days leading up to the race flooded the grounds and made some roads leading to the track impassible. Officials decided to postpone the race until Monday May 31 in order to allow the grounds to dry out. Speedway management would maintain their policy to not race on Sundays until 1974.

After a loss in 1912, Ralph DePalma succeeded in victory for 1915. DePalma was accompanied by riding mechanic Louis Fontaine.

Results

Race details
For 1915, riding mechanics were required.
When about 2,000 unsuspecting fans showed up on May 29 for the race (which had already been rescheduled to May 31), Ralph DePalma entertained the fans with a tire changing exhibition.
(Note 1) Louis Chevrolet is usually shown as American but his application for a US passport (available at ) reveals that he did not become a US citizen until June 1915.
(Note 2) Ralph DePalma is usually shown as American but his application for a US passport (available at ) reveals that he did not become a US citizen until 1920.

References

Indianapolis 500 races
Indianapolis 500
Indianapolis 500
Indianapolis 500
May 1915 sports events